Alexander Johann Fatiadi (October 22, 1922 – September 16, 2010)  was a chemist.

He obtained his masters from George Washington University, Washington DC (1957). He has worked at the National Bureau of Standards.

Selected publications
 A. J. Fatiadi and W. F. Sanger (1962), Tetrahydroxyquinone. Organic Syntheses, Coll. Vol. 5, p. 1011 (1973); Vol. 42, p. 90 (1962)
 Alexander J. Fatiadi, Horace S. Isbell, William F. Sager (1963), Cyclic Polyhydroxy Ketones. I. Oxidation Products of Hexahydroxybenzene (Benzenehexol). Journal of Research of the National Bureau of Standards A: Physics and Chemistry, volume 67A, issue 2, pages 153–162. Online version
 A. J. Fatiadi and W. F. Sager (1973), Hexahydroxybenzene [Benzenehexol] Organic Syntheses, Coll. Vol. 5, p. 595
 Alexander J. Fatiadi, Dielectric constant of n-hexane as a function of temperature, pressure, and density. NBS special publication, Issue 308, Page 175
 Alexander J. Fatiadi (1978), Synthesis of 1,3-(dicyanomethylene)croconate salts. New bond-delocalized dianion, "Croconate Violet". Journal of the American Chemical Society, volume 100 issue 8, pages 2586–2587. 
 Alexander J. Fatiadi (1980), Pseudooxocarbons. Synthesis of 1,2,3-tris(dicyanomethylene)croconate salts. A new bond-delocalized dianion, croconate blue. Journal of Organic Chemistry  volume 45, pages 1338–1339. 
 Lawrence M. Doane, Alexander J. Fatiadi (1981), Electrochemical Oxidation of Croconate Salts; Evidence of the Chemical Equivalence of the Carbonyl Oxygen Atom and the Dicyanomethylene Group Communication, Angewandte Chemie International Edition in English, Volume 21 Issue 8, Pages 635 - 636 
 A. Fatiadi (1987), The Classical Permanganate Ion: Still a Novel Oxidant in Organic Chemistry. Synthesis, volume 1987, issue 2, pages 85–127

References

21st-century American chemists
Columbian College of Arts and Sciences alumni